The Milne-Watson Baronetcy, of Ashley in Longbredy in the County of Dorset, is a title in the Baronetage of the United Kingdom. It was created on 11 June 1937 for David Milne-Watson. He was governor and managing director of the Gas Light & Coke Company and vice-president of the Federation of British Industries. The third Baronet was managing director of the Gas Light & Coke Company and deputy chairman of the British Steel Corporation.

Milne-Watson baronets, of Ashley (1937)
Sir David Milne-Watson, 1st Baronet (1869–1945)
Sir David Ronald Milne-Watson, 2nd Baronet (1904–1982)
Sir Michael Milne-Watson, 3rd Baronet (1910–1999)
Sir Andrew Michael Milne-Watson, 4th Baronet (born 1944)

Notes

References 
Kidd, Charles, Williamson, David (editors). Debrett's Peerage and Baronetage (1990 edition). New York: St Martin's Press, 1990, 

Milne-Watson
People educated at Merchiston Castle School